Cult of Luna is the debut EP by Swedish post-metal band Cult of Luna, released through Hydra Head Records in 2002 as a 7" vinyl.

Track listing
All tracks written by Cult of Luna.
 "Unfold the Inside" – 6:10
 "The Art of Self-Extermination"  – 6:02

References

2002 debut EPs
Cult of Luna albums
Hydra Head Records EPs